Anissa Tann (born 10 October 1967) is an Australian soccer coach and former player. As a powerful defender, she represented Australia in the 1995 and 1999 FIFA Women's World Cups as well as at the 2000 Sydney Olympics. Tann married Steve Darby in November 1994 and was known as Anissa Tann-Darby until 2001. Captain of the national team between 1991 and 1994, Tann was the first Australian to win 100 caps. She was inducted to the national Soccer Hall of Fame in December 2007.

Tann made her debut for Australia at the 1988 FIFA Women's Invitation Tournament, a prototype World Cup. In the first match she suffered a broken arm but played on to help Australia upset Brazil (represented by EC Radar) 1–0. Tann played in all four games as Australia made a quarter final exit in losing 7–0 to hosts China.

After Australia's poor showing at the 1995 FIFA Women's World Cup in Sweden, Tann and Julie Murray were dropped by coach Tom Sermanni. Both were recalled by new coach Greg Brown in 1997.

Tann's national team career ended in December 2002 when she tested positive for the banned steroid nandrolone and received a two-year global suspension. When Tann appealed to the Court of Arbitration for Sport (CAS), her explanation that the substance had been unknowingly ingested through a supplement bought in the United States was accepted but the ban was upheld due to the strict liability nature of the offence.

References

External links
 
 Profile at Football Federation Australia

1967 births
Living people
Australian women's soccer players
1995 FIFA Women's World Cup players
1999 FIFA Women's World Cup players
Australian Institute of Sport soccer players
Olympic soccer players of Australia
Footballers at the 2000 Summer Olympics
Sportswomen from New South Wales
Doping cases in Australian soccer
FIFA Century Club
Soccer players from Sydney
Australia women's international soccer players
Women's association football central defenders